Ochlandra travancorica, or Reed bamboo is a species of bamboo, endemic to the Western Ghats, India. It is naturalised in the West Indies.

References

 K. SijiMol, Suma Arun Dev and V. B. Sreekumar, A Review of the Ecological Functions of Reed Bamboo, Genus Ochlandra in the Western Ghats of India: Implications for Sustainable ConservationTropical Conservation Science Volume 9, Issue 1 Pages: 389 - 407 , https://journals.sagepub.com/doi/full/10.1177/194008291600900121

External links

Bambusoideae
Flora of the Indian subcontinent